Robinson: The Journey is a virtual reality video game developed and published by Crytek. The game released for the PlayStation 4 in November 2016, and for Microsoft Windows in February 2017. The game uses the PlayStation VR, Oculus Rift or SteamVR Compatible virtual reality headsets respectively on each platform. 

The game deals with a space traveler named Robin, who becomes stranded on a planet where dinosaurs still roam. He must then manage to escape, with the help of an AI unit from his ship.

Plot
The story begins when the main character, Robin, becomes stranded in a planet called Tyson III when his ship, the Esmeralda, makes a crash landing. Robin then travels around the planet with a flying orb, named HIGS, and a baby Tyrannosaurus Rex, James Laika. 

In the home campsite they fix a generator to get the power they need to free Laika. Then they travel to a farm, where they have to fix another generator. After that, they travel to the Tar Pit and Jungle (in any order) looking for any remaining HIGS units, to find out more about why the Esmeralda crashed. The HIGS units have black boxes which contain audio clips and images that help explain what happened to the Esmeralda.  Then Robin and HIGS go looking for Laika and end up in the sinkhole, which leads to a graveyard, and eventually the crashed Esmeralda. Then Robin must turn on the power in the Planetarium in the Esmeralda in order to see the last of the corrupted HIGS data.

The game ends with Robin, HIGS, and Laika fighting an adult t-rex, then watching the remaining HIGS data.

Demos
Crytek first showed their early work in the game in the form of two VR demos, titled Back to Dinosaur Island and Back to Dinosaur Island 2. Back to Dinosaur Island was first shown at Gamescom 2014, and both demos were later released for free for the Oculus Rift.

Reception

Robinson: The Journey received mixed reviews, according to review aggregator Metacritic.

References

External links

2016 video games
CryEngine games
Crytek games
Dinosaurs in video games
First-person adventure games
Games about extraterrestrial life
German science fiction
Oculus Rift games
PlayStation 4 Pro enhanced games
PlayStation VR games
Science fiction video games
Video games scored by Jesper Kyd
Video games developed in Germany
Video games set on fictional planets
Windows games
Virtual reality games